This list consists of albums or songs that have been considered the worst music ever made by various combinations of music critics, television broadcasters (such as MTV and VH1), radio stations, composers and public polls.

Albums

1960s–1970s
Philosophy of the World, the Shaggs (1969)The Shaggs were formed in 1965 by the teenage sisters Dorothy, Betty and Helen Wiggin. Though they had no interest in becoming musicians, they were forced to write, rehearse and record an album by their father, who believed that his mother had predicted their rise to fame. They composed bizarre songs with untuned guitars, erratically shifting time signatures, disconnected drum parts, wandering melodies and rudimentary lyrics about pets and families. Philosophy of the World developed a cult following, with fans including Frank Zappa and Kurt Cobain. After it was reissued in 1980, Rolling Stone suggested that it was the worst album ever recorded. In 2022, Vice wrote that it was the "best worst album of all time".
Lord Sutch and Heavy Friends, Screaming Lord Sutch (1970)  This supergroup was led by Sutch, a pioneer in the horror rock genre. It included some of Britain's best known-rock musicians, such as Led Zeppelin's Jimmy Page (who also produced the album) and John Bonham, guitarist Jeff Beck, session keyboardist Nicky Hopkins, and the Jimi Hendrix Experience's bassist, Noel Redding. Many of these players disowned the record when it was released. It was mentioned as the worst record ever released in a 1998 BBC poll. Rolling Stone called Sutch "absolutely terrible" and lamented that the collection of talented musicians on hand were made to sound "like a fouled parody of themselves".
Attila, Attila (1970)  Attila is the only album by psychedelic rock duo Attila, notable for featuring a young Billy Joel. Stephen Thomas Erlewine of AllMusic wrote, "Attila undoubtedly is the worst album released in the history of rock & roll—hell, the history of recorded music itself. There have been many bad ideas in rock, but none match the colossal stupidity of Attila." Joel has described it as "psychedelic bullshit".
Tony Sings the Great Hits of Today!, Tony Bennett (1970)  Bennett, in the midst of a career collapse, recorded the album under duress on orders from Clive Davis at Columbia Records. It consisted of cover versions of popular songs of the 1960s, and though some effort was made to select songs that were in line with Bennett's Great American Songbook standards, he was not eager to record the material, which he saw as banal. Retrospective reviews by Allmusic and Time considered the album a "disaster". A particular low point was Bennett's refusal to sing The Beatles' "Eleanor Rigby," instead reciting the song in the style of William Shatner. The album led to a mutual breakup between Columbia and Bennett from which his career would not recover until his son Danny revitalized his father's career in the 1980s.
Having Fun with Elvis on Stage, Elvis Presley (1974)  The album is a compilation of excerpts from Presley's concerts, containing almost no actual music and instead consisting mainly of banter and jokes between numbers. Many of the jokes refer to specific songs not included on the album. It ranked atop Jimmy Guterman and Owen O'Donnell's list of the worst rock and roll albums in the 1991 book The Worst Rock and Roll Records of All Time, bemoaning the lack of music on the album.
Metal Machine Music, Lou Reed (1975)  An album consisting entirely of guitar feedback loops, Metal Machine Music ranked No. 2 in the 1991 book The Worst Rock 'n' Roll Records of All Time by Jimmy Guterman and Owen O'Donnell. In 2005, Q magazine included the album in a list of "Ten Terrible Records by Great Artists" and ranked it #4 in its list of the 50 worst albums of all time.
Soundtrack to Sgt. Pepper's Lonely Hearts Club Band, Various artists (1978) The glam rock and disco Beatles cover soundtrack album was named the "worst ever" on Maxim's April 2000 list of pop albums from the 1970s to 1990s. The Sgt. Pepper's movie soundtrack was the first album in history to achieve "return platinum" status as stores took over four million copies of it off their shelves to ship back to their distributors. RSO Records destroyed hundreds of thousands of copies, crippling the company with a large financial loss. The Bee Gees, prominently featured on the soundtrack and in the film, were tarnished by the album's failure. However, they would recover with their next album Spirits Having Flown, the success of which led to this soundtrack being largely forgotten.

1980s–1990s
Elvis' Greatest Shit, Elvis Presley (1982) A posthumous bootleg compilation album consisting largely of outtakes and a selection of Presley's movie soundtrack songs of the 1960s that was made to deliberately highlight the worst of his career. Critics largely agreed that the compiler of the record succeeded in picking Presley's worst work.
Thank You, Duran Duran (1995) Thank You is a cover album named the worst-ever album by Q magazine in March 2006. Q's deputy editor Gareth Grundy said: "Duran Duran was the one that united everyone in agreement. We put it on in the office to remind ourselves how bad it was. Sometimes these things are redeemed by some sort of kitsch or novelty value, but it didn't even have that. It's not funny for even a split second and not even the sort of thing that you would put on for a laugh if you were drunk." Ken Scott, the engineer of the album, also thought "it turned out pretty badly" and the band considered it commercial suicide. Chris Gerard of Metro Weekly ranked it as Duran Duran's worst album.
Americana, The Offspring (1998) In a review for the Offspring's 2000 studio album Conspiracy of One, the A.V. Club critic Stephen Thompson harkens back to Americana regarding the album's novelty songs being similar to the single Original Prankster. Thompson called Americana, "the unbearable result being the kind of stupidity that thinks it's clever," and suggested that it hold the title of the worst album of the 1990s, stating "[Americana is] a record bad enough to create a backlash against not only pop-punk, but also novelty songs, guitars, smug thirtysomethings, and the human race."

2000s–2010s
Playing with Fire, Kevin Federline (2006)  The only album recorded by Kevin Federline, ex-husband of Britney Spears, Playing with Fire is review aggregator Metacritic's lowest-scoring album with a rating of 15. It was also a commercial failure, with first-week sales of only 6,000 in the U.S.
Chinese Democracy, Guns N' Roses (2008) This album was mired in development hell for eight years, and it received widely polarized responses ranging from very positive to scathing. Popular music historian Stephen Davis named it "the worst album ever." Music editor Ayre Dworken wrote: "Chinese Democracy is the worst album I have heard in years, if not in all my life of listening to music." It was included in Wired magazine's unranked list of the "5 Audio Atrocities to Throw Down a Sonic Black Hole" and placed first on Guitar Players "10 Awful Albums by 10 Amazing Bands" list. Chinese Democracy was ranked as the worst record of 2008 by several publications, including Time Out New York, Asbury Park Press and IGN. The Chicago Tribune noted the record in its end-of-year appraisal of 2008's worst in arts and entertainment. However, Rolling Stone, The Guardian, Spin, ABC News and Ultimate Classic Rock all included the album on best-of year-end lists.
Eoghan Quigg, Eoghan Quigg (2009)  Quigg's only album met with derision and has been described by numerous reviewers as the worst record ever made. One such writer was Peter Robinson of The Guardian, who called it an "album so bad that it would count as a new low for popular culture were it possible to class as either culture… or popular". and said on his Popjustice website that "decades into the future, Eoghan Quigg's album Eoghan Quigg will be the one that scoops the accolade" of worst record of all time. Gigwise placed the album at number one on its 20 Worst Albums of 2009 list.
Lulu, Lou Reed and Metallica (2011)  Pitchfork Media's Stuart Berman awarded the album a score of 1/10 and wrote that Lulu disappoints even in its "worst of all time" status. "For all the hilarity that ought to ensue here, Lulu is a frustratingly noble failure." NME also noted that the album was "one of the worst reviewed albums ever" and "one of the most critically panned albums of recent years". In response to massive backlash from Metallica fans, Lou Reed stated: "I don't have any fans left. After Metal Machine Music (1975), they all fled. Who cares? I'm in this for the fun of it."
Streets in the Sky, the Enemy (2012) Daily Record writer Rick Fulton reported that several of his readers considered Streets in the Sky to be "among the very worst releases of the year [2012], and indeed, all time". Critics were similarly harsh; the album is the second-lowest-rated ever at review aggregator site AnyDecentMusic?, and was the worst-reviewed of 2012 at fellow aggregator Album of the Year. John Calvert of Drowned in Sound awarded the record an unprecedented 0/10 and described it as "the un-music"; Neil Kulkarni in The Quietus agreed that the album is not "actually music" and is akin to "shite, in the noonday sun, attracting flies". Both critics wished for no further recordings from the band.
Nine Track Mind, Charlie Puth (2016) Doreen St. Félix in The New Yorker wrote, "Full of bland doo-wop ballads, 'Nine Track Mind' was, according to Metacritic, one of the worst-reviewed albums of all time. Puth seemed a genuine talent strained by nostalgia-baiting and the exigencies of social media." Pitchfork Media's Jia Tolentino wrote, "Puth cannot fill this frame of sentimentality with any genuine sentiment: The album’s emotional range covers the spectrum from light longing to light infatuation, contributing to the overall sense that 'Nine Track Mind' is aimed exclusively at hairlessness: children, prepubescents, the discomfitingly waxed."
Father of All Motherfuckers, Green Day (2020) In 2022, Loudwire published that Father of All Motherfuckers was the highest ranked rock album on a list of the worst albums of the 21st century, which was based on the Metacritic user score of 4.8 out of 10, and the album's critical scores as well.

Songs
The following songs have been named by critics, broadcasters, composers, and listeners as the "worst ever". Examples of sources include VH1's "50 Most Awesomely Bad Songs Ever" and Blender magazine's "Run for Your Life! It's the 50 Worst Songs Ever!".

1950s–1960s
 "Yes, Sir, That's My Baby", Harry Kari and His Six Saki Sippers (1953)  The mock-Japanese novelty record (a cover of a 1925 hit) was one of many released by dialect comic Harry Stewart under an alias (most of his others were under the name Yogi Yorgesson). While Stewart's records routinely got bad reviews in the press, a brief but particularly scathing review in Billboard may have earned the record enough publicity to chart on the magazine's own charts and prompted radio stations to play it. One radio disc jockey disparaged the record on-air as "the worst record (he had) ever heard" when playing it, and the record's poor quality inspired those in the music industry to record intentionally bad songs under the logic that if Stewart's record could be a hit, so could theirs (one example being "There's a New Sound" which purports to popularize the sounds made by worms).
 "!aaaH-aH ,yawA eM ekaT oT gnimoC er'yehT", Napoleon XIV (1966)  This record consists solely of "They're Coming to Take Me Away, Ha-Haaa!," a novelty hit for Jerry Samuels under the Napoleon XIV stage name, played in reverse, to the point that even the titled artist is not Napoleon or even Samuel, but "Vix Noelopan", the stage name spelled in reverse. In Dave Marsh's 1981 book The Book of Rock Lists, Marsh describes the song as the most obnoxious song to have ever been placed in a jukebox, noting it once caused a diner with 40 customers to be evacuated in the time it took to play the record in its entirety (shortly over two minutes).
 "Paralyzed", Legendary Stardust Cowboy (1968) This record features T Bone Burnett on drums and consists of one-chord strums, random and mostly unintelligible screaming, and an abrupt bugle solo. It was identified in the 1994 book The New Book of Rock Lists as the worst song ever released by a major label. Rhino Records also included it on The World's Worst Records. The Legendary Stardust Cowboy developed a cult following and is an outsider music icon who has received praise for his unorthodox work. 
 "MacArthur Park", Richard Harris (1968)  In 1992, Miami Herald journalist Dave Barry conducted a poll among his readers, who selected the Harris original as the worst track ever recorded, both in terms of "Worst Lyrics" (written, along with melody, by Jimmy Webb) and "Worst Overall Song". This is despite the fact that it topped the music charts in Europe and Australia, won the 1969 Grammy Award for Best Arrangement Accompanying Vocalists, and would again become a number-one hit during the disco era in the form of a 1978 cover by Donna Summer; it would also be spoofed by Weird Al Yankovic in 1993 as "Jurassic Park".
 "Ob-La-Di, Ob-La-Da", the Beatles (1968) This song was loathed by band members John Lennon and George Harrison, and was voted the worst track ever recorded in a listener poll organized by Mars, Incorporated. It also appeared in Blender magazine's "50 Worst Songs Ever", where it is ranked 48th.

1970s–1980s
 "(You're) Having My Baby", Paul Anka (1974)  The No. 1 worst song as voted by CNN.com users in 2006, the song was criticized for its perceived patronizing take on pregnancy from the expecting father's point of view.
 "Dance with Me", Reginald Bosanquet (1980)  A disco song with lyrics narrated in the style of a British newscast. Bosanquet had recently resigned as a news anchor for Independent Television News. It was voted number one in the Bottom 30 by listeners of British DJ Kenny Everett in 1980.
 "The Birdie Song", The Tweets (1981)  A straight cover of the popular children's novelty dance the "Chicken Dance" by Werner Thomas.   Voted the most annoying track of all time in a 2000 Dotmusic poll. The Clash guitarist Mick Jones also named it the worst song ever written (along with "Billy Don't Be a Hero" by Paper Lace), as did Simon Burnton in The Guardian.
 "Ebony and Ivory", Paul McCartney featuring Stevie Wonder (1982) This duet used the materials that constitute the black and white keys on musical keyboards as a metaphor for racial harmony. It ranked number one in a BBC 6 Music poll of the worst duets in history and number 10 in Blenders poll of worst songs ever, and it has repeatedly been described as "saccharine" for its heavy-handed approach to its subject.
 "True", Spandau Ballet (1983)  "True" was noted as the worst song ever by St. Petersburg Times music columnist Sean Daly and The Guardian journalist Luke Williams; Williams's colleague Michael Hann described the track as "dreadful wine-bar soul". Seattle Post-Intelligencer critic Robert Jamieson called it the worst love song of all time. The track also appeared in the Houston Press "10 Songs We Never, Ever Want to Hear Again, Ever" while the line "I bought a ticket to the world but now I've come back again" was included in NMEs "50 Worst Pop Lyrics of All Time".
 "Agadoo", Black Lace (1984)  The song was voted worst song of all time by a panel of professional music writers and industry experts published in a 2003 Q magazine poll. It was also banned from being played on BBC Radio 1 for a period because it was not viewed as a "credible" song.
 "Sussudio", Phil Collins (1985)  Critic Michael Saunders in the Sun-Sentinel named "Sussudio" as the worst song of the rock era, describing it as "insipid" and "indefensibly stupid". Guardian journalist Tom Service wrote: "'Sussudio' brings me out in a cold sweat… there's no colder or more superficial sound in popular music." Michael Musto in The Village Voice listed it as the second worst song ever and said that it "could have been the theme song for the Third Reich, it was that insidious and evil". Creative Loafing Charlotte writer Matt Brunson called it the worst song of the 1980s. The track has also been criticized for sounding too similar to Prince's "1999"; Mark Caro in the Chicago Tribune labelled it a "ripoff".
 "We Built This City", Starship (1985)  This single from the group's album Knee Deep in the Hoopla is often cited as the worst song of all time. It was ranked number one on Blender magazine's list of the worst songs of all time and "The 10 Worst Songs of the 1980s" in Rolling Stone. It was called the worst song of all time by GQ and The A.V. Club, and named one of the worst songs of all time in a readers' poll in New York Post. It has been disowned by the group's co-lead singer Grace Slick.
 "Don't Worry, Be Happy", Bobby McFerrin (1988)  This song was named by Village Voice critic Michael Musto as the worst of all time, and it topped Q100 DJ Bert Weiss's list of tracks he would forever ban from radio. In the "50 Worst Songs Ever", Blender said that "it's difficult to think of a song more likely to plunge you into suicidal despondency than this" and also lambasted its "appalling" lyrics.

1990s–2000s
 "Ice Ice Baby", Vanilla Ice (1990)  Spinner editors ranked this the second-worst track in history, while Blender staff placed it fifth. A Houston Press critic named it as the worst song ever to emanate from the state of Texas, and said that it "set back the cause of white people in hip-hop a decade".
 "Achy Breaky Heart", Billy Ray Cyrus (1992)  The song has appeared on multiple "worst songs ever" lists. It was named the worst of all time in The Independent on Saturday, and was ranked second in Blender's "50 Worst Songs Ever". It also placed first in a Sydney Morning Herald reader poll to determine the worst track of the 1990s, and was voted by Chicago Tribune readers as the worst song of 1992.
 "Could It Be Magic", Take That (1992) This cover of the 1975 Barry Manilow track was voted the worst song in history in a 2004 public poll organized by Diesel. NMEs Anthony Thornton said of the result, "Thank God that 'Could It Be Magic?' has finally been recognized as the worst song in the world. It is the kind of track that makes you wake up screaming."
 "What's Up?", 4 Non Blondes (1993)  Composers Carl Barât and Stuart Braithwaite named this track the worst ever. Dean Ween said: "It's as bad as music gets…. Everything about the song is so awful that if I sat down and tried to write the worst song ever, I couldn't even make it 10 percent of the reality of how awful that song is." Tara Dublin in The Huffington Post wrote that it is "without question, the worst song of the 1990s".
 "Mr Blobby", Mr Blobby (1993)  Blobby's self-titled Christmas release is regarded by many as the worst single of all time. It has been ranked near the top of various "worst songs" lists compiled by journalists and those created from public-opinion surveys.
 "Barbie Girl", Aqua (1997)  Despite its success, with UK sales of 1.83 million as of 2016, the novelty dance track has been included on some worst songs lists, including #1 on Rolling Stones "Worst Songs of the Nineties" by a reader poll and in NME's unranked list "32 of the Very Worst UK Number One Singles of All Time". The song was voted number one in the 1998 NME award for Worst Single.
 "Life", Des'ree (1998) "Life" was Des'ree's biggest hit in Europe, whereas "You Gotta Be" was a bigger hit in America, but it was widely mocked for its lyrics. One verse has been voted as having the worst lyrics ever in polls by the BBC, The Independent, and the Herald Sun: "I don't want to see a ghost/It's the sight that I fear most/I'd rather have a piece of toast/Watch the evening news."
 "Nookie", Limp Bizkit (1999)
 "Nookie" was listed at number 1 in Buzzfeed's list of the 30 worst songs ever written. Buzzfeed contributor Ryan Broderick said that "It should be against the law to be Fred Durst."
"Thong Song", Sisqó (2000)
 "Thong Song" placed first in a St. Paul Pioneer Press reader poll to determine the worst song in history. It has also been labelled as sexist.
 "The Christmas Shoes", NewSong (2000) The song has appeared on various "worst Christmas song" lists. It was named "The Worst Christmas Song Ever" in 2011 by Gawker.com following a survey of commenter votes.
 "Who Let the Dogs Out?", Baha Men (2000) The song ranked atop Spinner's "Top 20 Worst Songs Ever".
 "The Cheeky Song (Touch My Bum)", The Cheeky Girls (2002) The song was voted the no. 1 "worst pop record" by Channel 4 viewers in a poll broadcast in January 2004.
 "Big Yellow Taxi", Counting Crows featuring Vanessa Carlton (2003) A cover of the 1970 Joni Mitchell song, "Big Yellow Taxi" was featured in the film Two Weeks Notice. The Village Voice named this cover the worst song of the 2000s. NME also included it on its list of the worst songs of the 2000s and Ultimate Classic Rock highlighted the song in its Terrible Classic Rock Covers series. The Village Voice's scathing review of the cover is archived and displayed on Joni Mitchell's website.
 "You're Beautiful", James Blunt (2005) "You're Beautiful" was voted by music fans as the most irritating track ever recorded in a OnePoll survey. Spike writer D. Sussman called it "the worst song in the history of mankind", and Gigwise editors placed it first in "The 20 Worst Love Songs of All Time". It also ranked first in Heavy.com's recounting of the worst tracks of the 2000s. In 2014, Blunt issued a public apology for the record, blaming its ubiquity on the record company's promotion techniques.
 "My Humps", the Black Eyed Peas (2005) According to Robert Christgau of The Village Voice in 2006, "a Black Eyed Peas sex trifle some consider the worst record of all time". Oakland Tribune music columnist Oliver Wang reported that the track is "considered by most critics as either the worst song of this decade or in all of recorded music history". Writers who named it as the worst track ever include Nathan Rabin in The A.V. Club, Laura Barton in The Guardian, Joseph Kugelmass in PopMatters and Shaun Bruce in The Stranger; Bruce stated that it "may actually represent the nadir of human achievement". It gained first place in a Rolling Stone reader poll of the all-time "20 Most Annoying Songs" and its lyrics were voted the worst in the history of dance music in a Global Gathering survey.
 "Rockstar", Nickelback (2006) Some critics have named this the worst song of all time. The Guardians Peter Robinson said: "this song makes literally no sense and is the worst thing of all time." It was listed at number 2 in Buzzfeed's list of the 30 worst songs ever written. Buzzfeed contributor Ryan Broderick said that "'Rockstar' is the most unequivocally terrible [song] of their catalog. If aliens came to Earth and asked why everyone hates Nickelback so much, this song would be a perfect explanation." A 2008 Popjustice poll voted "Rockstar" as the worst single of the year.

2010s–2020s
 "Baby", Justin Bieber featuring Ludacris (2010) The official music video was the most disliked clip on YouTube until 2018. It was also voted the worst ever in a Time Out poll.
 "Miracles", Insane Clown Posse (2010) CraveOnline deemed this the worst rap song of all time and the most embarrassing rap moment of all time. The Phoenix deemed it the worst song ever recorded. The lyrics have been called the worst of all time, most notably: "Fucking magnets, how do they work? And I don't wanna talk to a scientist / Y'all motherfuckers lying, and getting me pissed."
 "We Are the World 25 for Haiti", Artists for Haiti in 2010 (2010) This is a remake of the 1985 hit song "We Are the World," which was written by American musicians Michael Jackson and Lionel Richie and recorded by various prominent singers to benefit famine relief in Africa. The cover version was released on February 12, 2010 during the opening ceremony of the 2010 Winter Olympics as a CD single and music download. The song was panned by contemporary music reviewers, with criticism focused on the song's new musical additions as well as the choice of artists who appear on the track. However, the song was commercially successful worldwide, charting within the top 20 in multiple countries.

 "Friday", Rebecca Black (2011) "Friday" has been widely described as the worst song ever recorded, attracting derision for its weak lyrical content and its vocals that were excessively processed by Auto-Tune. Produced by Patrice Wilson, the song became an Internet sensation, making it the subject of multiple parodies and ridicule.
 "Swagger Jagger", Cher Lloyd (2011) Missing Andy singer Alex Greaves named this the worst track ever. The song appeared in NME'''s unranked list "32 of the Very Worst UK Number One Singles of All Time".
 "Hot Problems", Double Take (2012) ABC News stated that this was the worst song of 2012 and of all time.

 "Chinese Food", Alison Gold (2013)An independent song also produced by Patrice Wilson, "Chinese Food" has been criticized as the worst song ever created and the worst song of the year by Time magazine. The song and especially the video have also been criticized as racist for the heavy Chinese stereotyping present in both.
 "Literally I Can't", Play-N-Skillz, featuring Redfoo, Lil Jon, and Enertia McFly (2014) Billboard ranked the song first on in its "The 10 Worst Songs of the 2010s (So Far)" list. Music Weekly named it the worst song of 2014. Several media outlets considered the song to be misogynistic soon after its release.
 "It's Everyday Bro", Jake Paul featuring Team 10 (2017) Uproxx ranked the song first on its "The Worst Songs of 2017" list. "It's Everyday Bro" was also No. 1 on Consequence of Sounds "The Absolute Worst Pop Lyrics of 2017" list. A diss track, the song was criticized for its ridiculous lyrics, notably "I just dropped some new merch and it's selling like a god church" and "England is my city". It became the fourth-most-disliked YouTube video as well as the second-most-disliked YouTube music video (behind "Baby" by Justin Bieber) of 2017. The song ignited a wave of feuds and disses directed toward Paul, most notably YouTubers RiceGum and Alissa Violet's "It's Every Night Sis".
 "Yummy", Justin Bieber (2020) In a recap of the best and worst music of 2020, Insider recalled that "Justin Bieber releasing 'Yummy' was the first sign that 2020 would be an awful year." A country remix featuring Florida Georgia Line was placed at number 6 on a list of 2020's worst songs, published by Variety. Despite the mainly negative reception, "Yummy" was nominated for a Grammy Award for Best Pop Solo Performance, though ultimately lost to "Watermelon Sugar" by Harry Styles. Rolling Stone later called the nomination of "Yummy" for the award the "least deserved Grammy nomination".

Others
In 1953, following the success of Harry Kari's "Yes Sir...," Tony Burrello and Tom Murray, bitter that their more serious music was struggling to find an audience without success, decided to launch Horrible Records to intentionally record the worst music possible. The label recorded one single, "There's a New Sound" by Burrello, backed by "Fish" by former silent film actress Leona Anderson.

In 1997, artists Komar and Melamid and composer Dave Soldier released "The Most Unwanted Song," designed after surveying 500 people to determine the most annoying lyrical and musical elements. These elements included bagpipes, cowboy music, an opera singer rapping and a children's choir that urged listeners to go shopping at Walmart. As described by the online service UbuWeb, "The most unwanted music is over 25 minutes long, veers wildly between loud and quiet sections, between fast and slow tempos... with each dichotomy presented in abrupt transition." The conceptual artists also recorded "The Most Wanted Song", a love song designed based on survey results to feature the most popular subject and instrumentation. Both tracks include, as an in-joke, references to philosopher Ludwig Wittgenstein.

Classical music media has run fewer "worst-ever" lists than have been produced for pop music, either for composers or individual pieces. There have been articles on the worst recorded versions (including those of Florence Foster Jenkins) and the worst classical album covers.

The worst song to appear in a film is annually awarded the Golden Raspberry Award for Worst Original Song. This "award" was given from the ceremony's inception in 1980 until 1999 and resurfaced in 2002. It parodies the Academy Award for Best Original Song.

Some publications have compiled lists of the "worst" music videos ever."50 Worst Music Videos Ever", NME.com, undated. Retrieved 29 December 2011. Album cover artwork has also been subject to "all-time worst" lists."Must Try Harder: 75 Terrible Album Sleeves"  NME.com, 3 April 2015. Retrieved 24 April 2015."The 25 worst album covers of all time", Designer Daily, 11 August 2009. Retrieved 29 December 2011. Individual tastes can vary widely such that very little consensus can be achieved. For example, the winning song in a CNN email poll received less than five percent of the total votes cast.

See also
 List of controversial album art
 List of classical music with an unruly audience response
 The Rhino Brothers Present the World's Worst Records''
 Outsider music
 Cult following

References

Worst
Worst
Music